NGC 3861 is a large barred spiral galaxy with a ring-like structure located about 310 million light-years away in the constellation Leo. It was discovered by astronomer John Herschel on March 23, 1827. NGC 3861 is a member of the Leo Cluster and has a normal amount of neutral hydrogen (H I) and ionised hydrogen (H II).

NGC 3861 is a low luminosity type II Seyfert galaxy. However, it is also classified as a LINER galaxy.

On March 7, 2014 a type Ia supernova designated as SN 2014aa was discovered in NGC 3861.

References

External links

Barred spiral galaxies
Seyfert galaxies
LINER galaxies
Overlapping galaxies
Leo Cluster

Leo (constellation)
3861
Astronomical objects discovered in 1827
36604
6724
Discoveries by John Herschel